Pietro Scoppola (December 14, 1926 – October 25, 2007) was an Italian historian, academic, and politician.

Biography 
He taught at University of Rome La Sapienza and was senator for Christian Democracy from 1983 to 1987. He was also a Catholic who examined the church's relationship with the rise of fascism in Italy.

Works
 Dal neoguelfismo alla Democrazia cristiana, Studium, 1957
 Crisi modernista e rinnovamento cattolico in Italia, Il Mulino, 1961
 Chiesa e Stato nella storia d'Italia, Laterza, 1967
 La Chiesa e il fascismo, Laterza, 1971
 La proposta politica di De Gasperi, Il Mulino, 1977
 La "nuova cristianità" perduta, Studium, 1985
 25 aprile. Liberazione, Einaudi 1995
 La Repubblica dei partiti. Evoluzione e crisi di un sistema politico, Il Mulino, 1997
 La Costituzione contesa, Einaudi, 1998
 La democrazia dei cristiani, Il Mulino, 2005

References

 Enciclopedia Multimediale delle Scienze Filosofiche biography
 Rai Educational biography

External links 

 Italian Senate Page

20th-century Italian historians
2007 deaths
1926 births
Academic staff of the Sapienza University of Rome
Senators of Legislature IX of Italy